Do It All Night is an album by Curtis Mayfield.  It incorporated many disco sounds used by other 1970s guitarists. "No Goodbyes" was released as a single. "You Are, You Are" was written by Mayfield for Linda Clifford and available on her 1978 lp If My Friends Could See Me Now.

Track listing
 "Do It All Night" (Gil Askey, Curtis Mayfield) – 8:17
 "No Goodbyes" (Askey, Mayfield) – 7:40 
 "Party, Party" (Askey, Mayfield) – 7:54
 "Keeps Me Loving You" (Mayfield) – 3:24 
 "In Love, In Love, In Love" (Mayfield) – 4:20
 "You Are, You Are" (Mayfield) – 3:38

Personnel
Curtis Mayfield - lead vocals, guitar
Keni Burke - bass 
Donelle Hagan - drums
Henry Gibson - bongos, congas
Gary Thompson - rhythm guitar
Joseph "Lucky" Scott - bass
 Floyd Morris, Rich Tufo - keyboards
The Jones Girls, Kitty Haywood and the Haywood Singers - backing vocals
Gil Askey - arrangements
Technical
Jim Burgess - mixing
Ed Thrasher, John Cabalka - art direction
Brad Kanawyer - design
Claude Mougin - photography

References

1978 albums
Curtis Mayfield albums
Albums produced by Curtis Mayfield
Curtom Records albums